Machanga District is a district of Sofala Province in Mozambique. The principal town is Machanga. The district is located in the south of the province, and borders with Buzi District in the north, Mabote and Govuro Districts of Inhambane Province in the south, Machaze District of Manica Province in the west, and with Chibabava District in the northwest. In the east, the district is limited by the Indian Ocean. It has a population of 51,855 as of 2007.

Geography
The principal river in the district is the Save River, which separates it from Inhambane Province.

History
The district was established on 25 July 1986.

Demographics
As of 2005, 46% of the population of the district was younger than 15 years. 25% did speak Portuguese. The most common mothertongue is Cindau. 81% were analphabetic, mostly women.

Administrative divisions
The district is divided into three postos, Machanga (one locality), Divinhe (three localities), and Chiloane (two localities).

Economy
Less than 1% of the households in the district have access to electricity.

Agriculture
In the district, there are 8,000 farms which have on average  of land. The main agricultural products are corn, cassava, cowpea, peanut, sorghum, sweet potato, and rice.

Transportation
There road network in the district is underdeveloped and consists of two secondary roads, ER428 and ER429, in a bad state.

References

Districts in Sofala Province
States and territories established in 1986